The Vilayet of Diyâr-ı Bekr was a first-level administrative division (vilayet) of the Ottoman Empire, wholly located within what is now modern Turkey. The vilayet extended south from Palu on the Euphrates to Mardin and Nusaybin on the edge of the Mesopotamian plain. After the establishment of Republic of Turkey in 1923, the region was incorporated into the newly created state.

The accuracy of the population figures ranges from "approximate" to "merely conjectural" depending on the region from which they were gathered.

History
The Vilayet of Diyarbakir was created in 1867. In 1867 or 1868 Mamuret-ul-Aziz and the Kurdistan Eyalet merged with and joined the Vilayet of Diyarbakir. In 1879–80 Mamuret-ul-Aziz was separated again from the Vilayet of Diyarbakir, and turned into the Vilayet of Mamuret-ul-Aziz. It was one of the six Armenian Vilayets of the Empire.

Administrative divisions

Sanjaks of the vilayet:
 Diyarbekir Sanjak (Diyarbakır, Lice, Silvan, Derik, Beşiri)
 Mardin Sanjak (Mardin, Cizre, Midyat, Savur, Nusaybin and maybe Silopi)
 Ergani Sanjak (Maden, Palu)
 Siverek Sanjak (Split from Diyarbekir in 1907) (Siverek, Çermik, Viranşehir)

Demographics 
The Vilayet was a place in which the Christian population was systematically massacred during World War I during the 1915 genocide in Diyarbekir.

See also 
Massacres of Diyarbakır (1895)
1915 genocide in Diyarbekir
Six Vilayets

References 

Hakan Özoğlu, "Kurdish Notables and the Ottoman State" SUNY, 2004

External links
 
 

 
Vilayets of the Ottoman Empire in Anatolia
History of Batman Province
History of Diyarbakır Province
History of Elazığ Province
History of Mardin Province
History of Şanlıurfa Province
History of Siirt Province
1867 establishments in the Ottoman Empire
1922 disestablishments in the Ottoman Empire